Berkshire Park is a suburb of Sydney, in the state of New South Wales, Australia. It covers  within the local government area of City of Penrith.  The suburb has a diverse range of activity, including a pet cemetery, correctional facility, nature reserve, waste management centre and a racehorse education centre.

Origin of name
The suburb's name is believed to have come from the English county of Berkshire. The land was given to Richard Rouse as a land grant in 1838. Rouse may have chosen this name because he had been married in North Hinksey, which was then part of Berkshire.

Berkshire Park Post Office opened on 1 May 1936 and closed in 1961.

Community services
There is a large recreational area located on 6th Rd, Berkshire Park. Part of this area is a reserve for public use, with seating areas and a children's playground. There is also a public hall and the station of the Berkshire Park Rural Fire Brigade, a brigade of the NSW Rural Fire Service.

Heat record

Demographics
According to the 2016 census, there were 2,134 people in Berkshire Park.
 Aboriginal and Torres Strait Islander people made up 12.5% of the population. 
  76.0% of people were born in Australia and 41.2% of people only spoke English at home.

Transport
At approximately 55 km from the centre of Sydney, it is in a somewhat isolated area. The closest train stations are Windsor and Riverstone.

References

External links
 City of Penrith Local Suburb Profiles – Berkshire Park NSW, Australia

Suburbs of Sydney
City of Penrith